Lopshill is a hamlet in the New Forest district in Hampshire, England. It is in the civil parish of Damerham.  It is about 4 miles (7 km) from the New Forest National Park. The nearest town is Fordingbridge, which lies approximately 4.7 miles (6.4 km) east of the village.

Notes

Hamlets in Hampshire